Claudio López (1767 – 1 Jan 1833) was a Californio politician who served as mayordomo of Mission San Gabriel Arcángel and Alcalde of Los Angeles.

Biography

Claudio López was born in 1767 in San José del Cabo. His parents, Ignacio López and María Facunda López, were members of the prominent and wealthy López family, descended from Castilian aristocracy. He had four siblings: Juan, Juan Francisco, María Francisca, and María de la Encarnación.

López was the Mayordomo of San Gabriel for more than thirty years, serving under Frs. José María de Zalvidea and José Bernardo Sánchez. As Mayordomo, he was responsible for managing the affairs of the mission, including its orchards, vineyards, and warehouses, and overseeing the native laborers. He also supervised the various ranchos subordinate to the mission, such as San Bernardino, Ucaipe, El Chino, San Jose, Cucamonga, Santa Anita, Rosa de Castilla, and San Pasqual. His success at this made him a locally popular figure, with contemporary writer Hugo Reid remarking that, unlike most mission officials, López achieved his successes "without flogging".

For his work as Mayordomo, López was granted the use of a rancho, which he named Santa Anita in honor of Anita Cota, whom he hoped to marry. After Anita's death, López instead married her cousin María Luisa Cota on 20 April 1789. The couple had two children: Estevan López and Maria Ygnecia Valenzuela.

In 1826, López became Alcalde-Mayor of the Pueblo de Los Angeles. He served a single term, and afterwards continued as Mayordomo of San Gabriel until his death in 1833.

References

1767 births
1833 deaths
Californios
Mayors of Los Angeles